Antonino Zichichi (born 15 October 1929) is an Italian physicist who has worked in the field of nuclear physics. He has served as President of the World Federation of Scientists, as a professor at the University of Bologna, and is associated with American conservative think-tank the Heartland Institute.

Biography
Zichichi was born in Trapani, Sicily, in 1929. He has collaborated on several discoveries in the field of sub-nuclear physics and has worked in numerous research laboratories such as Fermilab in Chicago and CERN in Geneva. In 1963, he founded the Centro Ettore Majorana of Erice, dedicated to scientific culture. The Ettore Majorana centre sponsors the International School of Subnuclear Physics, where Zichichi serves as director.

He was president of the Istituto Nazionale di Fisica Nucleare from 1977 up to 1982 and in 1980 he strongly backed the creation of the Laboratori Nazionali del Gran Sasso. Currently, he is an emeritus professor of physics at the University of Bologna. He is president of the World Federation of Scientists, an organization concerned with the fight against planetary emergencies. He was one of the creators of Erice statement.

Honors and assignments
Knight Grand Cross of the Order of Merit of the Italian Republic
Order of Merit of the Italian Republic
Grand Officer of the Order of Merit of the Italian Republic
President of European Physical Society (1978-1980)
President of Italian National Institute of Nuclear Physics (1977-1982)
President of Commission OTAN of Technologies for Disarmament
Representative of EEC in the Scientific Committee of the International Centre for Science and Technology in Moscow
President of Historical Museum of Physics and Research Centre "E. Fermi"
Laurea Honoris Causa from Peking University, Buenos Aires, Malta, Bucharest, Arizona, Torino
Member of the Academy of Sciences of the Republic of Ukraine
Member of the Academy of Sciences of Georgia
Member of Pontifical Academy of Sciences
Order of Merit of the Republic of Poland
Order of Merit of the Federal Republic of Germany
Enrico Fermi Award (Italian Physical Society) 
Asteroid 3951 Zichichi is named after Zichichi.

Publications
L'infinito, Lausanne, G. Galilei, 1988; Milano, Rizzoli, 1994; Milano, Nuova Pratiche Editrice, 1998.
Scienza ed emergenze planetarie. Il paradosso dell'era moderna, Milano, Rizzoli, 1993.
'Perché io credo in Colui che ha fatto il mondo, Milano, Il Saggiatore, 1999, L'irresistibile fascino del Tempo. Dalla resurrezione di Cristo all'universo subnucleare, Milano, Il Saggiatore, 2000, Subnuclear Physics. The first 50 years highlights from Erice to ELN, Singapore, World Scientific, 2000.Galilei divin uomo, Milano, Il Saggiatore, 2001, Il vero e il falso. Passeggiando tra le stelle e a casa nostra, Milano, Il Saggiatore, 2003, Galilei. Dall'Ipse Dixit al processo di oggi. 100 risposte, Milano, Il Saggiatore, 2004, Tra Fede e Scienza. Da Giovanni Paolo II a Benedetto XVI, Milano, Il Saggiatore, 2005, Creativity in Science, World Scientific, 1996Giovanni Paolo II. Il Papa Amico della Scienza'', Marco Tropea Editore, 2011, 
Zichichi, A.,"Bruno Pontecorvo and his vision"; the content of the paper is a part of the special volume published by the Italian Physical Society (2013) to celebrate the Hundredth Anniversary of Bruno Pontecorvo.

See also

Erice
Galileo Galilei
Violette Impellizzeri

References

External links

, Professor of the History of Science at the University of Padova.
Official Biography of Zichichi at the Ettore Majorana Foundation

Galilei Divin Uomo: Book review by Elio Fabri, professor of physics at the University of Pisa. Part I and Part II

 of Piergiorgio Odifreddi (Book review)
Scientific publications of Antonino Zichichi on INSPIRE-HEP

1929 births
Living people
People associated with CERN
People from Trapani
Italian nuclear physicists
20th-century Italian physicists
Italian Roman Catholics
Italian science writers
Members of the Pontifical Academy of Sciences
Scientists from Sicily
Academic staff of the University of Bologna
Recipients of the Order of Merit of the Federal Republic of Germany
Presidents of the European Physical Society